() is an old form of German-language handwriting based on late medieval cursive writing, also known as  ("cursive script"),  ("German script") and German cursive. Over the history of its use into the first part of the 20th century, many individual letters acquired variant forms.

German writers used both cursive styles,  and Latin cursive, in parallel: location, contents, and context of the text determined which script style to use.

 is a modern script based on  that is characterized by simplified letters and vertical strokes. It was developed in 1911 and taught in all German schools as the primary script from 1935 until the beginning of January 1941.

Lettering examples

See also 
 Antiqua–Fraktur dispute
 Blackletter
 Fraktur (script)

References

External links 

 Another version, by Lars Erik Bryld, called Manu Gothica
 Yet another version, by Peter Wiegel
 More information about German 
 Kurrent-Schreibmaschine – Old German typewriter An online assistant for better reading Kurrent

In German Wikipedia 
  (letter ß)
  handwriting
  handwriting

Blackletter
German orthography
Palaeography
Penmanship
Western calligraphy